This page lists board and card games, wargames, miniatures games, and tabletop role-playing games published in 2011.  For video games, see 2011 in video gaming.

Games released or invented in 2011

Game awards given in 2011
Spiel des Jahres: Qwirkle
Kennerspiel des Jahres: 7 Wonders
Deutscher Spiele Preis: 7 Wonders
Games: Tikal II: The Lost Temple
 Ora et Labora won the Spiel Portugal Jogo do Ano.

Significant games-related events in 2011
Quebec-based distributor Filosofia purchases Z-Man Games.

Deaths

See also
List of game manufacturers
2011 in video gaming

References

Games
Games by year